Road is the debut self-titled studio album by American hard rock band Road. Released in 1972, it was the only album to be released by the band, who split up the same year. The song "My Friends" was originally recorded by bassist Noel Redding's previous band, Fat Mattress, but went unreleased at the time, making the Road version the first published recording of the song. (The Fat Mattress version has since appeared on the complete works package The Black Sheep of the Family: The Anthology, on which it is incorrectly listed as "Little Girl in White".)

Reception

In a review for allmusic, critic Sean Westergaard criticised the performances of each musician, as well as the songwriting and production quality, and summarized the album as "little more than warmed-up post-Hendrix hard rock, heavy on the wah pedal."

Track listing

Personnel
Road
Noel Redding – bass, vocals, production
Rod Richards – guitar, vocals, artwork, production
Leslie Sampson – drums, vocals, percussion, production
Additional personnel
Murray Roman – executive production
Tom Wilson – production
Bob Hughes – engineering
Doug Graves – engineering assistance
Rod Dyer – graphic design
Ron Raffaelli – photography

References

1972 debut albums
Albums produced by Tom Wilson (record producer)